Moncef Lazaâr (24 May 1942 – 25 November 2018) was a Tunisian actor and screenwriter.

Biography
Moncef Lazaâr was a prominent actor in theatrical compositions, but he is best known for his TV movies, most notable of which was when he played Mohamed Hadj Slimane in the TV series Ghada in 1994. He also portrayed Abdelkader Jerbi in the 1995 series El Hassad alongside actress Dalila Meftahi.

In 2005, he wrote the script for the movie Chara Al Hobb, which was directed by Hamadi Arafa.

Filmography

Theatre
Almalayika
Allayl Ah Ya Layl
Baba We Ando Bouh

References

Tunisian male stage actors
Tunisian screenwriters
Place of death missing
Place of birth missing
2018 deaths
Tunisian male television actors
20th-century Tunisian male actors
21st-century Tunisian male actors
Male screenwriters
1942 births